This article contains a chronological summary of the events from the 2015 Pan American Games in Toronto, Ontario, Canada.

Scheduling changes
The aquatics events were scheduled to be held roughly around the same time as the 2015 World Aquatics Championships scheduled in Kazan, Russia. The Organizing Committee's goal is to have the best athletes competing at the Games and thus the schedule for the five aquatics disciplines had to be changed to accommodate athletes. The synchronized swimming competition actually was moved to the day before the opening ceremony, diving events began on the day of the opening ceremony (when events are traditionally not held on the day of the ceremony), open water swimming was moved to the first weekend of the games, swimming was reduced to a five-day schedule (down from seven in Guadalajara, Mexico), and water polo competitions began three days before the opening ceremony. All events were scheduled to be completed by July 24, six days before the opening ceremonies of the World Championships, which in itself was moved back a week to accommodate the games. The change in schedule meant that for the first time ever, events were held before the opening ceremony.

The 2015 World Archery Championships were scheduled later in July, not to conflict with the games, while the 2015 World Fencing Championships, which would finish the day before the fencing competitions begin, would have events coordinated to allow athletes to compete at both events. Finally, the second round of the 2015 Davis Cup was moved ahead one week not to conflict with the tennis competitions. Tennis competitions also began before the opening ceremony, to allow athletes to compete in both events.

Calendar
In the following calendar for the 2015 Pan American Games, each blue box represents an event competition, such as a qualification round, on that day. The yellow boxes represent days during which medal-awarding finals for a sport are held. The number in each box represents the number of finals that will be contested on that day.

Medal table

Day (–3) – Tuesday 7 July 2015
The first competitions of the Games took place.

 Water polo
 Men's tournament: First day of Preliminaries
 Group A:  27–0 
 Group B:  9–9 
 Group B:  9–11 
 Women's tournament: First day of Preliminaries
 Group A:  3–25 
 Group B:  11–11 
 Group B:  7–7

Day (–2) – Wednesday 8 July 2015

 Water polo
 Men's tournament: Second day of Preliminaries
 Group A:  8–21 
 Group A:  21–4 
 Group B:  2–22 
 Women's tournament: Second day of Preliminaries
 Group A:  8–10 
 Group A:  18–3 
 Group B:  4–15

Day (–1) – Thursday 9 July 2015

 Synchronized swimming
 Women's duet: Technical routine
 Women's team: Technical routine

 Water polo
 Men's tournament: Third day of Preliminaries
 Group A:  7–7 
 Group B:  22–9 
 Group B:  2–16 
 Women's tournament: Third day of Preliminaries
 Group A:  10–3 
 Group B:  1–18 
 Group B:  19–3

Day 0 – Friday 10 July 2015

 Cycling
 Men's BMX: Time trials
 Women's BMX: Time trials

 Diving
 Men's 3 metre springboard: Preliminaries
 Women's 10 metre platform: Preliminaries

 Tennis
 Men's Singles: First Round

Opening ceremony
 The opening ceremony of the 2015 Pan American Games took place on Friday July 10, 2015, beginning at 8:00 p.m. EDT at the Pan Am Dome.

Day 1 – Saturday 11 July 2015

Detailed results (day 1)

 Badminton
 Round of 64 for Men's singles and Women's singles, Round of 32 for all five events.

 Baseball
 Men's tournament: First day of Preliminaries
  3–10 
  9–10 
  4–1 

 Canoeing
 Women's K-4 500 metres: The gold was awarded to Canada with the time of 1:36.495, silver awarded to Cuba with the time of 1:37.665, bronze awarded to Argentina with the time of 1:37.721.

 Cycling
 Men's BMX: In the final, Tory Nyhaug (Canada) won the gold with the time of 36.208, Alfredo Campo Vintimilla (Ecuador) finished second at the time of 36.501, Nicholas Long (USA) finished third at the time of 37.046.
 Women's BMX: In the final, Felicia Stancil (USA) won the gold with the time of 41.647, Domenica Azuero Gonzalez (Ecuador) finished second at the time of 41.948, Mariana Diaz (Argentina) finished third at the time of 42.611.

 Diving
 Men's 3 metre springboard: Rommel Pacheco (Mexico) awarded a total score of 483.35 to win gold, Jahir Ocampo (Mexico) awarded a silver with the total score of 442.15, Philippe Gagné (Canada) awarded a bronze with the total score of 421.10.
 Women's 10 metre platform: Paola Espinosa (Mexico) awarded a total score of 383.20 to win gold, Roseline Filion (Canada) awarded a silver with the total score of 377.60, Meaghan Benfeito (Canada) awarded a bronze with the total score of 357.45.

 Equestrian
 Individual dressage: Grand Prix
 Team dressage: Grand Prix

 Football
 Women's tournament: First day of First Round
 Group A:  0–1 
 Group A:  2–2 
 Group B:  0–3 
 Group B:  5–2 

 Gymnastics
 Men's artistic team all-around: Team USA won the gold with the total score of 267.750, Brazil finished silver with the total score of 264.050, Colombia finished bronze with the total score of 259.300.

 Judo
 Men's 60 kg:
 Semi-final no. 1:  defeated 
 Semi-final no. 2:  defeated 
 Bronze Medal Match no. 1:   defeated 
 Bronze Medal Match no. 2:   defeated 
 Gold Medal Match:   defeated  
 Women's 48 kg:
 Semi-final no. 1:  defeated 
 Semi-final no. 2:  defeated 
 Bronze Medal Match no. 1:   defeated 
 Bronze Medal Match no. 2:   defeated 
 Gold Medal Match:   defeated  
 Women's 52 kg:
 Semi-final no. 1:  defeated 
 Semi-final no. 2:  defeated 
 Bronze Medal Match no. 1:   defeated 
 Bronze Medal Match no. 2:   defeated 
 Gold Medal Match:   defeated  

 Roller sports
 Men's free skating: Short program
 Women's free skating: Short program

 Rowing
 Men's single sculls: Heats and Repechages
 Men's double sculls: Heats and Repechages
 Men's lightweight double sculls: Heats and Repechages
 Men's coxless four: Heats
 Women's double sculls: Heats
 Women's lightweight double sculls: Heats and Repechages
 Women's coxless pair: Heats

 Rugby sevens
 Men's tournament: Preliminary round
 Group A:  26–7 
 Group A:  34–0 
 Group A:  46–0 
 Group A:  20–17 
 Group A:  38–0 
 Group A:  52–0 
 Group B:  19–7 
 Group B:  45–0 
 Group B:  41–0 
 Group B:  26–14 
 Group B:  31–5 
 Group B:  21–7 
 Women's tournament: First day of Preliminary round
 Pool Play:  55–0 
 Pool Play:  26–7 
 Pool Play:  5–40 
 Pool Play:  40–0 
 Pool Play:  22–5 
 Pool Play:  60–0 
 Pool Play:  7–54 
 Pool Play:  36–0 
 Pool Play:  24–19 

 Squash
 Men's singles: First Round and Second Round
 Women's singles: First Round

 Swimming
 Women's marathon 10 kilometres: Eva Fabian (USA) won the marathon after the time of 2:03:17.0, Paola Perez Sierra (Venezuela) takes silver with the time of 2:03:17.0, Samantha Arévalo (Ecuador) takes bronze with the time of 2:03:17.1.

 Women's duet: The gold was awarded to Canada (Jacqueline Simoneau and Karine Thomas) after being given a final score of 178.0881, Mexico (Karem Achach and Nuria Diosdado) was awarded a silver medal after a final score of 170.7800, USA (Mariya Koroleva and Alison Williams) finished third place after a final score of 166.3876.
 Women's team: Canada awarded gold after a final score of 178.1094, Mexico awarded silver after a final score of 172.5073, USA finished third after a final score of 166.0351.

 Tennis
 Men's Singles: Second round
 Men's Doubles: First day of First round
 Women's Singles: First day of First round

 Triathlon
 Women's: Bárbara Riveros (Chile) finished gold with the time of 1:57:18, Paola Díaz (Mexico) finished silver with the time of 1:57:48, Flora Duffy (Bermuda) finished bronze with the time of 1:57:56.

 Water polo
 Men's tournament: Fourth day of Preliminaries
 Group A:  14–3 
 Group A:  3–10 
 Group B:  9–19 
 Women's tournament: Fourth day of Preliminaries
 Group A:  30–3 
 Group A:  9–11 
 Group B:  17–10 

 Weightlifting
 Men's 56 kg: Habib de las Salas (Colombia) set a Pan American Games record of 152 kg in the clean and jerk and finished the gold with a score of 269 kg, Carlos Berna (Colombia) takes silver with a score of 265 kg, Luis García (Dominican Republic) takes bronze with a score of 256 kg.
 Men's 62 kg: Óscar Figueroa (Colombia) won the gold with a score of 310 kg, Francisco Mosquera (Colombia) takes silver with a score of 305 kg, Jesús Lopez (Venezuela) takes bronze with a score of 283 kg.
 Women's 48 kg: Cándida Vásquez (Dominican Republic) set a Pan American Games record of 81 kg in snatch and another Pan American Games record for a total score of 181 kg, to win gold. Ana Segura (Colombia) set a Pan American Games record of 103 kg in clean and jerk and also finished with a total score of 180 kg and thus was awarded the silver. Beatriz Pirón (Dominican Republic) takes bronze with a score of 175 kg.

Gold medalists (day 1)

Day 2 – Sunday 12 July 2015

Detailed results (day 2)

 Badminton
 Round of 16 for all five events.

 Baseball
 Men's tournament: Second day of Preliminaries
  8–5 
  10–3 
  5–2 

 Canoeing
 Men's K-4 1000 metres: Cuba awarded gold with the time of 3:01.744, silver awarded to Brazil with the time of 3:01.869, bronze awarded to Argentina with the time of 3:02.079.

 Cycling
 Men's cross-country: Raphaël Gagné (Canada) crossed the finished line first with the time of 1:31:14, beating Catriel Soto (Argentina) time of 1:32:04. Stephen Ettinger (USA) was a third at 1:33:02.
 Women's cross-country: Emily Batty (Canada) finished first with the time of 1:27:13, Catharine Pendrel (Canada) finished second with the time of 1:27:20, Erin Huck (USA) finished third with the time of 1:32:36.

 Diving
 Men's 10 metre platform: Iván García (Mexico) won gold with a total score of 521.70, Víctor Ortega (Colombia) takes silver with a total score of 455.15, Jonathan Ruvalcaba (Mexico) takes bronze with a total score of 437.35.
 Women's 3 metre springboard: Jennifer Abel (Canada) won gold with a total score of 384.70, Pamela Ware (Mexico) takes silver with a total score of 326.00, Dolores Hernández (Mexico) takes bronze with a total score of 323.10.

 Equestrian
 Individual dressage: Grand Prix Special
 Team dressage: USA won gold with a total score of 460.506, Canada takes silver with a total score of 454.938, Brazil takes bronze with a total score of 414.895.

 Football
 Men's tournament: First day of First round
 Group A:  2–1 
 Group A:  1–4 

 Gymnastics
 Women's artistic team all-around: USA won gold with the total score of 173.800, silver went to Canada with a total score of 166.500, bronze went to Brazil with a total score of 165.400.

 Judo
 Men's 66 kg:
 Semifinal no. 1:  defeated 
 Semifinal no. 2:  defeated 
 Bronze Medal Match no. 1:   defeated 
 Bronze Medal Match no. 2:   defeated 
 Gold Medal Match:   defeated  
 Men's 73 kg:
 Semifinal no. 1:  defeated 
 Semifinal no. 2:  defeated 
 Bronze Medal Match no. 1:   defeated 
 Bronze Medal Match no. 2:   defeated 
 Gold Medal Match:   defeated  
 Women's 57 kg:
 Semifinal no. 1:  defeated 
 Semifinal no. 2:  defeated 
 Bronze Medal Match no. 1:   defeated 
 Bronze Medal Match no. 2:   defeated 
 Gold Medal Match:   defeated  

 Roller sports
 Artistic
 Men's free skating: Marcel Stürmer (Brazil) won the gold with the score of 536.00, John Burchfield (USA) takes silver with the score of 505.00, Diego Duque (Colombia) takes bronze with the score of 496.70.
 Women's free skating: Giselle Soler (Argentina) won the gold with the score of 519.70, Talitha Haas (Brazil) takes silver with the score of 498.30, Marisol Villarroel (Chile) takes bronze with the score of 479.70.
 Speed
 Men's 200 metres time-trial: Emanuelle Silva (Chile) won the gold with the time of 16.138, Pedro Causil (Colombia) takes silver with the time of 16.149, Jorge Martínez (Mexico) takes bronze with the time of 16.355.
 Women's 200 metres time-trial: Hellen Montoya (Colombia) won the gold with the time of 17.653, Ingrid Factos (Ecuador) takes silver with the time of 17.994, María José Moya (Chile) takes bronze with the time of 18.042.

 Rowing
 Men's quadruple sculls: Heats
 Men's coxless pair: Heats and Repechages
 Men's lightweight coxless four: Heats and Repechages
 Men's eight: Heats
 Women's single sculls: Heats and Repechages
 Women's lightweight single sculls: Heats and Repechages
 Women's quadruple sculls: Heats

 Rugby sevens
 Men's tournament: Classification round and Medal round
 Quarterfinals:  31–0 
 Quarterfinals:  17–12 
 Quarterfinals:  12–5 
 Quarterfinals:  53–0 
 Fifth through Eighth places:  0–31 
 Fifth through Eighth places:  14–7 
 Semifinals:  19–26 
 Semifinals:  7–43 
 Seventh place match:  26–22 
 Fifth place match:  12–7 
 Bronze medal match:   40–12 
 Gold medal match:   22–19  
 Women's tournament: Second day of Preliminary round and Medal round
 Pool Play:  0–45 
 Pool Play:  0–29 
 Pool Play:  0–71 
 Pool Play:  5–5 
 Pool Play:  57–0 
 Pool Play:  34–12 
 Fifth Place Game:  17–17 
 Bronze Medal Game:   29–0 
 Gold Medal Game:   7–55  

 Sailing
 Race 1 in all 10 sailing events.

 Shooting
 Men's 10 metre air pistol: Felipe Almeida Wu (Brazil) sets a Final Pan Amerincan Games Record with the score of 201.8, Jay Shi (USA) takes silver with the score of 199.0, Mario Vinueza (Ecuador) takes bronze with the score of 176.3.
 Women's 10 metre air pistol: Lynda Kiejko (Canada) sets a Final Pan Amerincan Games Record with the score of 195.7, Alejandra Zavala (Mexico) takes silver with the score of 194.3, Lilian Castro (El Salvador) takes bronze with the score of 172.0.

 Softball
 Men's tournament: First day of Preliminaries
  0–10 
  3–0 
  10–5 

 Squash
 Men's singles: Quarterfinals and Semifinals (two bronze medals were awarded to each loser in the semifinals):
  3–0  
  3–2  
 Women's singles: Quarterfinals and Semifinals (two bronze medals were awarded to each loser in the semifinals):
  3–0  
  3–0  

 Swimming
 Men's marathon 10 kilometres: Chip Peterson (USA) won the marathon after the time of 1:54:03.6, David Heron takes silver with the time of 1:54:07.4, Esteban Enderica (Ecuador) takes bronze with the time of 1:54:09.2.

 Tennis
 Men's Singles: Third Round
 Men's Doubles: Second day of First round
 Women's Singles: Second day of First round
 Mixed Doubles: First round

 Triathlon
 Men's: Crisanto Grajales (Mexico) finished gold with the time of 1:48:58, Kevin McDowell (USA) finished silver with the time of 1:48:59, Irving Pérez (Mexico) finished bronze with the time of 1:49:05.

 Water polo
 Women's tournament: Crossover and Semifinals
 Crossover:  10–8 
 Crossover:  6–14 
 Semifinals:  7–14 
 Semifinals:  16–3 

 Weightlifting
 Men's 69 kg: Luis Javier Mosquera (Colombia) set a Pan American Games record of 150 kg in snatch, 181 kg in clean and jerk and another in total of 331 kg, Bredni Roque (Mexico) takes silver with a score of 317 kg, Francis Luna-Grenier (Canada) takes bronze with a score of 299 kg.
 Women's 53 kg: Rusmeris Villar (Colombia) set a Pan American Games record of 115 kg in clean and jerk and finished the gold with a score of 201 kg. Génesis Rodríguez (Venezuela) finished with a total score of 201 kg, but lost the tiebreaker based on body weight and thus was awarded the silver. Yafreisy Silvestre (Dominican Republic) takes bronze with a score of 183 kg.
 Women's 58 kg: Lina Rivas (Colombia) finished with the gold with a final score of 215 kg, Yusleidy Figueroa (Venezuela) takes silver with the total score of 209 kg, Quisia Guicho (Mexico) takes bronze with the total score of 203 kg.

Gold medalists (day 2)

Day 3 – Monday 13 July 2015

Detailed results (day 3)

 Badminton
 Quarterfinals for all five events.

 Baseball
 Men's tournament: Third day of Preliminaries
  8–1 
  3–5 
  1–9 

 Beach volleyball
 Men's tournament: First day of Preliminaries
 Women's tournament: First day of Preliminaries

 Canoeing
 Men's C-1 1000 metres: Isaquias Queiroz (Brazil) awarded gold with the time of 4:07.866, silver awarded to Mark Oldershaw (Canada) with the time of 4:09.587, bronze awarded to Everardo Cristóbal (Mexico) with the time of 4:14.572.
 Men's C-2 1000 metres: Benjamin Russell and Gabriel Beauchesne-Sévigny (Canada) awarded gold with the time of 3:46.316, silver awarded to Erlon de Souza Silva and Isaquias Queiroz (Brazil) with the time of 3:47.117, bronze awarded to Serguey Torres and José Carlos Bulnes (Cuba) with the time of 3:49.932.
 Men's K-1 1000 metres: Jorge García (Cuba) awarded gold with the time of 3:40.990, silver awarded to Daniel Dal Bo (Argentina) with the time of 3:42.019, bronze awarded to Adam van Koeverden (Canada) with the time of 3:43.055.
 Men's K-2 1000 metres: Jorge García and Reinier Torres (Cuba) awarded gold with the time of 3:25.932, silver awarded to Pablo de Torres and Gonzalo Carreras (Argentina) with the time of 3:27.240, bronze awarded to Celso Dias De Oliveira Junior and Vagner Junior Souta (Brazil) with the time of 3:30.104.
 Women's K-1 500 metres: Yusmari Mengana (Cuba) awarded gold with the time of 2:00.656, silver awarded to Michelle Russell (Canada) with the time of 2:02.381, bronze awarded to Ana Paula Vergutz (Brazil) with the time of 2:03.329.

 Diving
 Men's synchronized 3 metre springboard: Jahir Ocampo and Rommel Pacheco (Mexico) won gold with a total score of 438.27, Philippe Gagné and François Imbeau-Dulac (Canada) takes silver with a total score of 413.37, Cory Bowersox and Zachary Nees (USA) takes bronze with a total score of 385.38.
 Men's synchronized 10 metre platform: Jeinkler Aguirre and José Guerra (Cuba) won gold with a total score of 439.14, Vincent Riendeau and Philippe Gagné (Canada) takes silver with a total score of 404.34, Víctor Ortega and Juan Guillermo Rios (Colombia) takes bronze with a total score of 403.23.
 Women's synchronized 3 metre springboard: Paola Espinosa and Dolores Hernández (Mexico) won gold with a total score of 301.20, Jennifer Abel and Pamela Ware (Canada) takes silver with a total score of 298.23, Deidre Freeman and Maren Taylor (USA) takes bronze with a total score of 293.10.
 Women's synchronized 10 metre platform: Meaghan Benfeito and Roseline Filion (Canada) won gold with a total score of 316.89, Ingrid De Oliveira and Giovanna Pedroso (Brazil) takes silver with a total score of 291.36, Paola Espinosa and Alejandra Orozco (Mexico) takes bronze with a total score of 287.91.

 Field hockey
 Women's tournament: First day of Preliminary round
 Pool A:  9–0 
 Pool A:  12–1 
 Pool B:  7–2 
 Pool B:  5–0 

 Football
 Men's tournament: Second day of First round
 Pool B:  0–4 
 Pool B:  1–1 

 Gymnastics
 Men's artistic individual all-around: Samuel Mikulak (USA) won gold with the total score of 89.650, silver went to Manrique Larduet (Cuba) with a total score of 89.600, bronze went to Jossimar Calvo (Colombia) with the total score of 89.400.
 Women's artistic individual all-around: Ellie Black (Canada) won gold with the total score of 58.150, silver went to Madison Desch (USA) with a total score of 57.450, bronze went to Flávia Saraiva (Brazil) with the total score of 57.050.

 Judo
 Men's 81 kg: 
 Semifinal no. 1:  defeated 
 Semifinal no. 2:  defeated 
 Bronze Medal Match no. 1:   defeated 
 Bronze Medal Match no. 2:   defeated 
 Gold Medal Match:   defeated  
 Men's 90 kg:
 Semifinal no. 1:  defeated 
 Semifinal no. 2:  defeated 
 Bronze Medal Match no. 1:   defeated 
 Bronze Medal Match no. 2:   defeated 
 Gold Medal Match:   defeated  
 Women's 63 kg:
 Semifinal no. 1:  defeated 
 Semifinal no. 2:  defeated 
 Bronze Medal Match no. 1:   defeated 
 Bronze Medal Match no. 2:   defeated 
 Gold Medal Match:   defeated  
 Women's 70 kg:
 Semifinal no. 1:  defeated 
 Semifinal no. 2:  defeated 
 Bronze Medal Match no. 1:   defeated 
 Bronze Medal Match no. 2:   defeated 
 Gold Medal Match:   defeated  

 Roller sports
 Men's 500 metres: Pedro Causil (Colombia) won the gold with the time of 40.650, Ezequiel Capellano (Argentina) takes silver with the time of 40.909, Jorge Martínez (Mexico) takes bronze with the time of 41.146.
 Men's 10,000 metres points race: Mike Paez (Mexico) won gold with 23 points, Juan Sebastian Sanz Neira (Colombia) takes silver with 13 points, Jordan Belchos (Canada) takes bronze with 9 points.
 Women's 500 metres: Hellen Montoya (Colombia) won the gold with the time of 43.370, Erin Jackson (USA) takes silver with the time of 43.714, Ingrid Factos (Ecuador) takes bronze with the time of 43.875.
 Women's 10,000 metres points race:

Gold medalists (day 3)

Day 4 – Tuesday 14 July 2015

Detailed results (day 4)

Gold medalists (day 4)

Day 5 – Wednesday 15 July 2015

Detailed results (day 5)

Gold medalists (day 5)

Day 6 – Thursday 16 July 2015

Detailed results (day 6)

Gold medalists (day 6)

Day 7 – Friday 17 July 2015

Detailed results (day 7)

Gold medalists (day 7)

Day 8 – Saturday 18 July 2015

Detailed results (day 8)

Gold medalists (day 8)

Day 9 – Sunday 19 July 2015

Detailed results (day 9)

Gold medalists (day 9)

Day 10 – Monday 20 July 2015

Detailed results (day 10)

Gold medalists (day 10)

Day 11 – Tuesday 21 July 2015

Detailed results (day 11)

Gold medalists (day 11)

Day 12 – Wednesday 22 July 2015

Detailed results (day 12)

Gold medalists (day 12)

Day 13 – Thursday 23 July 2015

Detailed results (day 13)

Gold medalists (day 13)

Day 14 – Friday 24 July 2015

Detailed results (day 14)

Gold medalists (day 14)

Day 15 – Saturday 25 July 2015

Detailed results (day 15)

Gold medalists (day 15)

Day 16 – Sunday 26 July 2015

Detailed results (day 16)

Gold medalists (day 16)

References

2015 Pan American Games
Chronological summaries of the Pan American Games